Red Konga (in Spanish Konga Roja) is a Mexican drama film directed by Alejandro Galindo. It was released in 1943 and starring María Antonieta Pons and Pedro Armendáriz.

Plot
The supervisor of a banana packing plant, is the target of a union opponents. While focusing on the defense of union members of his plant and maintain his life goals in his workplace, the supervisor is stolen by a gang of bad guys. His supposed best friend is one of the culprits. His life is further complicated by an affair with a singer in a port tavern.

Cast
 María Antonieta Pons
 Pedro Armendáriz
 Carlos López Moctezuma
 Tito Junco
 Toña la Negra

Reviews
In 1943 the Cuban actress and rumbera María Antonieta Pons had a greater advantage in her budding career by starring in a film with Pedro Armendáriz, a leading figure of the Mexican Cinema. The director was Alejandro Galindo. The actress was fully, having crossed the barrier of the Rumberas, which at that time only put as musical complement in movies. She was considered a good actress, with capacity for melodrama.

References

External links
 
 Synopsis of Red Konga in Abandomoviez

1943 films
Mexican black-and-white films
Rumberas films
1940s Spanish-language films
Mexican drama films
1943 drama films
1940s Mexican films